Jamuna Dhaki is a 2020 Indian Bengali language romantic thriller drama television series that premiered on 13 July 2020 on Zee Bangla. It is also available on the digital platform ZEE5 before it's telecast. It is produced by Snehasish Chakraborty of Blues Productions and stars Shweta Bhattacharya and Rubel Das in the lead roles. After a successful run of almost 2 years, the show concluded on 1 July 2022.

Plot
This show narrates the story of a girl, Jamuna, who goes to the Roy mansion to play the dhak on behalf of her father. Jamuna is forced to take up her father's position as a drum player. When she gets married into an aristocratic family, she struggles to maintain a balance in her personal and professional life.

Cast

Main
 Shweta Bhattacharya as
 Jamuna Roy (née Das) / Jyoti Sen (in disguise): Sangeet's wife, a professional  Dhaki, Kedar and Anuradha's daughter in-law, Ganga and Shiuli's daughter, Krishna and Goja's elder sister.
 Jhimli Chowdhury
 Rubel Das as Sangeet Roy: Jamuna's husband, Kedar & Anuradha's son, Ganga and Shiuli's elder son in-law, Geet's brother.

Recurring
 Debjani Chattopadhyay as Anuradha Roy: Kedar's wife, Sangeet's & Geet's mother, Ved and Jamuna's mother in law, a dancer.
 Kaushik Banerjee as Kedar Roy: Anuradha's husband, Sangeet's and Geet's father, Ved and Jamuna's father in law, a landlord. 
 Soma Dey as Bindhubasini Roy: Kedar's step mother, Kalyan, Ragini and Imon's mother
 Chandni Saha as Geet Sen (née Roy): Kedar's and Anuradha's daughter, Sangeet's sister, Ved's wife
 Raja Ghosh / Aditya Chowdhury as Ved Sen: Geet's husband
 Kanchana Moitra as Ragini: Kedar's step sister, Rajanya and Pallabi's mother
 Rana Mitra as Prashanta: Ragini's husband, Rajanya and Pallabi's father  
 Indrakshi Dey as Aarja Chowdhury: Rocky's fake wife and Sangeet's obsessive lover    
 Gourav Ghoshal as Rathindra Roy aka Rocky: Roy family's adoptive son, Aarja's fake husband 
 Ananya Biswas as Tathoi Roy: Jamuna's competitor & an enemy of Roy family
 Biplab Banerjee as Kalyan Roy: Kedar's step brother, Mallika's husband, Shree's father, Sangeet's uncle 
 Mallika Banerjee as Mallika Roy: Kalyan's wife, Shree's mother, Sangeet's aunt
 Payel Sarkar as Shree Roy: Kalyan and Mallika's daughter
 Juiee Sarkar as Rajanya: Ragini and Prashanta's daughter
 Bristi Roy as Pallabi: Ragini and Prashanta's daughter 
 Indrakshi Nag as Imon: Kedar's step sister, Sanjoy's wife
 Saikat Das as Sanjoy: Imon's husband
 Kushal Chakraborty as Riddhiman Chatterjee: Anuradha's former lover and Jamuna's mentor
 Shankar Debnath as Ganga Dhaki: Jamuna's father
 Sagarika Roy as Shiuli: Jamuna's mother
 Maahi Kar as Krishna: Jamuna's sister
 Sayantan Shaan Sarkar as Laltu: Krishna's husband 
 Reshmi Bhattacharya as Lagna Sen: Ved's mother
 Rajib Banerjee as Rajib Sen: Ved's father 
 Arpita Dutta Chowdhury as Sharbani: Ved's aunt
 Sonali Chatterjee as Aarja's mother
 Uma Bardhan as Aarja's aunt
 Sayantani Majumdar as Rumni: Roy family's relative
 Biswanath Basu as Pobon Dhaki: Jamuna's competitor
 Subhadra Mukherjee as Gayatri Chowdhury 
 Soumodip Singha Roy as Palash Chowdhury 
 Supriyo Dutta as Prashad Chowdhury: Gayatri's husband
 Roshni Ghosh as Binni Chowdhury

Reception

Ratings

Adaptations

References 

2020 Indian television series debuts
2022 Indian television series endings
Indian drama television series
Bengali-language television programming in India
Zee Bangla original programming